Torta Maria Luisa is a dessert found in Colombian and Salvadoran cuisine. It is a type of layer cake, similar to the English Victoria sponge cake.

References

Colombian cuisine
Salvadoran cuisine
Layer cakes